Didarak (also Romanized as Dīdarak) is a village in Banestan Rural District, in the Central District of Behabad County, Yazd Province, Iran. At the 2006 census, its population was 7, in 4 families.

References 

Populated places in Behabad County